R. N. R. Manohar (died 17 November 2021) was an Indian actor and director. He directed films like Maasilamani (2009) and Vellore Maavattam (2011).

Career
RNR Manohar started his career as a child artist, having played roles in films such as Rathinirvedam (as Krishnachandran's brother), Nidra, and as the hero's friend in Kuyiline Thedi. Later, he assisted K. S. Ravikumar in films like Band Master and Suriyan Chandran. He wrote dialogues for Kolangal and also worked as assistant and appeared in a small role as reporter in that film. He wrote dialogues for Thennavan and Punnagai Poove. Manohar played a small role in Thennavan appearing as a gangster who tries to kill Vivek instead gets killed by him. As an actor, he was seen playing small negative roles in films like Dhill ,Sutta Pazham very recently, "Salim". He also  He appeared as Nassar's brother in law in Veeram and as Ajith's uncle in "Ennai Arinthaal".

In 2002, Manohar announced that he would direct a film titled Velu featuring Prashanth and Simran in the lead role, though the film later did not materialise.

He made his directorial debut with Maasilamani. His second directorial was Vellore Maavattam, a police drama.

Death
Manohar died on 17 November 2021, at a hospital in Chennai from COVID-19 complications during the COVID-19 pandemic in India.

Filmography

As director and writer

As actor

Television

References

2021 deaths
Male actors in Tamil cinema
Tamil film directors
Film directors from Tamil Nadu
Male actors from Tamil Nadu
20th-century Indian male actors
21st-century Indian male actors
Tamil screenwriters
Screenwriters from Tamil Nadu
Deaths from the COVID-19 pandemic in India
1967 births